A white Russian is a cocktail made with vodka, coffee liqueur (e.g., Kahlúa or Tia Maria) and cream served with ice in an old fashioned glass.

History
The traditional cocktail known as a black Russian, which first appeared in 1949, becomes a white Russian with the addition of cream. Neither drink has any known Russian origin, but both are so-named due to vodka being the primary ingredient. It is unclear which drink preceded the other.

The Oxford English Dictionary refers to the first mention of white Russian in the sense of a cocktail as appearing in California's Oakland Tribune on November 21, 1965. It was placed in the newspaper as an insert: "White Russian. 1 oz. each Southern, vodka, cream", with "Southern" referring to Coffee Southern, a short-lived brand of coffee liqueur by Southern Comfort.

The white Russian saw a surge in popularity after the 1998 release of the film The Big Lebowski. Throughout the movie, it appears as the beverage of choice for the protagonist, Jeffrey "The Dude" Lebowski. On a number of occasions he refers to the drink as a "Caucasian".

Preparation

As with all cocktails, various modes of preparation exist, varying according to the recipes and styles of particular bars or mixologists. Most common varieties have adjusted amounts of vodka or coffee liqueur, or mixed brands of coffee liqueur. Shaking the cream in order to thicken it prior to pouring it over the drink is also common. Sometimes the drink is prepared on the stove with hot coffee for a warm treat on cold days. Conversely, vanilla ice cream has been known to be used, rather than cream, to make it frozen.

Variations

Many variants of the cocktail exist, both localized and widely known, such as a blind Russian (also known as a muddy water) which substitutes cream with Irish cream, a mudslide (a blind Russian with both), an Anna Kournikova (named after the tennis player), made with skimmed milk (i.e. a "skinny" white Russian), a Russian cherry orchard made with the addition of Grand Marnier (named for the play by Anton Chekhov), a white Cuban (made with rum instead of vodka), or a dirty Russian (made with chocolate milk instead of cream).

A Colorado bulldog is very similar to the white Russian, using all traditional ingredients, but adding a splash of cola.

See also

List of cocktails
 List of coffee beverages

References

External links

Cocktails with vodka
Cocktails with coffee liqueur
Coffee culture
Alcoholic coffee drinks
Cocktails with milk
Creamy cocktails
Cocktails with ice cream